Walerian Łukasiński (15 April 1786 in Warsaw – 27 January 1868 in Shlisselburg) was a Polish officer and political activist. Sentenced by Russian Imperial authorities to 14 years' imprisonment, he was never released and died after 46 years of solitary incarceration, becoming a symbol of the Polish struggle for independence.

Biography

Born in Warsaw on 15 April 1786, as a child he lived through the last of the partitions of Poland that destroyed the Polish–Lithuanian Commonwealth. He joined the Polish military early, serving in the army of Duchy of Warsaw from 1807 to 1815 and later in that of Congress Poland. In Congress Poland, a puppet state of the Russian Empire, ruled by the Grand Duke Constantine Pavlovich of Russia, the Polish army's morale was very low. Łukasiński, who reached the rank of a major in the 4th Regiment of Line Infantry, took it upon himself to restore it, creating a secret organization known as National Freemasonry (Wolnomularstwo Narodowe), which existed from 1819 to 1820 and successfully raised morale.. In 1818 Łukasiński  published "Reflections of an Army Officer Concerning the Need of Organizing the Jews". In 1820 he formally disbanded National Freemasonry and replaced it by another secret organization, Patriotic Society (Towarzystwo Patriotyczne). Its goal was not a revolution but to influence public opinion and improve the lot of the oppressed, like peasants and Jews.

He ended up on the wrong side of Prince Constantine when he refused to sign an order condemning some innocent Polish officers of negligent duty. Soon afterwards he was denounced by a traitor for his involvement with secret conspirational organizations, and he was arrested by the Russian authorities and sentenced to 7 years of hard labour in Zamość. For participation in the prisoners revolt against inhumane conditions, he was accused of being one of the ringleaders (without much proof) and his sentence was doubled to 14 years.

After November Uprising Tsar Nicholas I of Russia became convinced that even imprisoned he must be one of the main activists of the Polish underground (when in fact he had no communications with the outside world and was not involved in any such activities) and moved to a secure facility in Warsaw. During the November Uprising (1830–1831) he was taken with the Russian troops retreating from Warsaw and put in one of the most secure prisons in Russia, the Shlisselburg Fortress. The tsar had given orders that he should not be allowed to speak to any other prisoners or guards; that he was to be kept there even after his sentence expired; and that his family was to remain unaware of his fate. Further, most of the commanders of the Shlisselburg prison were to be unaware of the exact identity of the prisoner. One of the few people who, at that time, managed to exchange - literally - a few sentences with Łukasiński, was Russian revolutionary Mikhail Bakunin, who was also imprisoned in Shlisselburg for several years. It was only a few years before his death, after the death of Tsar Nicholas, that a new commander of the prison successfully petitioned the more liberal Tsar Alexander II of Russia about improving his condition; Łukasiński was moved from a damp underground cell to a more comfortable cell above ground, where he was given new clothing and furniture and allowed to inquire about events outside and even keep a diary.

Influence
Known as the "iron major," he became one of the martyrs  of Polish culture and Poland's struggle for independence in the 19th and 20th centuries. Among the works of literature inspired by him, the most famous is Stanisław Wyspiański's Noc Listopadowa ("November Night").

In 2018 Roman Turovsky-Savchuk composed a tombeau in honor of Łukasiński.

References

 Biography
 (Łukasiński's diary)
Keynote address by Zbigniew Brzeziński (briefly summarizes Łukasiński's life)

1786 births
1868 deaths
Polish Army officers
Prisoners sentenced to life imprisonment by Russia
Prisoners who died in Russian detention
Prisoners of Shlisselburg fortress